Dickie Brennan's Steakhouse is a steakhouse located in the French Quarter of New Orleans, Louisiana.  The restaurant is part of the Dickie Brennan Family of restaurants and has received various awards from publications such as Playboy Magazine and Maxim Magazine.  Dickie Brennan's Steakhouse has also been featured in The Wall Street Journal.

It was established by Richard "Dickie" Brennan, Sr., and is operated by his son, Richard "Dickie" Brennan, Jr.

External links
Official Site

Restaurants in New Orleans
Steakhouses in the United States